Howard Cole (born 29 December 1943) in Cardiff, Wales is a former international motorcycle speedway rider.  He began his speedway career in 1961 at age 17, and rode for the Long Eaton Archers in 1964, the King's Lynn Stars for six years, and the Cradley Heathens in 1966 and 1974.  He later graduated with a teaching degree and taught at the Sydney Grammar Prep School until 2003.

Career summary
Cole first appeared at the age of three in a short video titled Child Motorcyclist 1948. Cole began riding speedway in 1961 for the Wolverhampton Wolves when he was 17. Because he was still at Wolverhampton Grammar School at the time he rode under the nom de plume "Kid Bodie" so that the school would not find out. He also used the nom de plume because he had been a mascot for the Wolverhampton and Birmingham teams in the early 1950s and did not want this to be known at the time. The following year he transferred to Stoke and rode for the Potters until he broke his arm in 1963. In 1964-1965 he rode for the Long Eaton Archers. In 1966 he joined the Cradley Heathens for a year. He then had six years with the King's Lynn Stars before rejoining Cradley for two seasons in 1973-1974. He qualified for and rode in the 1969 World Final at Wembley. He also rode in three British Championship finals from 1969–1971 and won the New Zealand Championship in Christchurch in 1967.

He regularly rode in New Zealand and Australia during the English winter months and represented England in team contests in the United Kingdom, Australia and New Zealand.

After retiring from speedway he moved to live in Sydney. He graduated with a teaching degree in 1978 and taught at Sydney Grammar Prep School until his retirement in 2003.

World Final Appearances
 1969 -  London, Wembley Stadium - 16th - 1 pt

References 

1943 births
Living people
British speedway riders
Welsh speedway riders
Welsh motorcycle racers
Wolverhampton Wolves riders
Stoke Potters riders
King's Lynn Stars riders
Cradley Heathens riders
Long Eaton Archers riders
People educated at Wolverhampton Grammar School